Ollie Johnson Quinn (26 May 1893 – 23 August 1949) was a mob boss in Galveston, Texas in the United States, who was involved in bootlegging, illegal gambling, numbers racket, prostitution and other criminal activities from the 1910s up until the 1930s. He, with Dutch Voigt, led the Beach Gang, one of the two criminal organisations which controlled most of the Galveston underworld until the mid-1920s.

He was generally considered the dominant figure in vice, especially gambling, on the island and was respected by most Galveston residents and other Galveston County inhabitants alike. His main casino, the Deluxe Club, was a fixture in the city. His Modern Vending Company leased gaming equipment such as slot machines to area businesses. Quinn was known for being, above all, a businessman who was accepting of honest competition in the vice business.

Quinn became a mentor, and then a partner, to Sam and Rosario Maceo, who later took over the Galveston underworld.

See also

Free State of Galveston
Johnny Jack Nounes
Rosario Maceo
Sam Maceo

References

Learn more
 
 
 

1893 births
1949 deaths

People from Galveston, Texas

History of Galveston, Texas
American gangsters